Sir Michael Smurfit, KBE (born 7 August 1936), is an English-born Irish businessman. In the "2010 Irish Independent Rich List" he was listed at 25th with a €368 million personal fortune.

Early life
Smurfit, who was born in St Helens, England, was educated at Clongowes Wood College, County Kildare, Ireland. He left school while a teenager and joined his father's company, Jefferson Smurfit & Sons Ltd, in 1955. In 1967, he was appointed joint managing director and was made deputy chairman in 1969. He was appointed chairman and chief executive officer of the Jefferson Smurfit Group in 1977, a position he held until his retirement as CEO in November 2002.

Business
At Jefferson Smurfit Group, Smurfit led the early expansion of the Group in both Ireland and the United Kingdom. He followed this with a series of acquisitions in the US, Latin America and Continental Europe. As chairman, Smurfit oversaw the merger of the Smurfit Group with Kappa Packaging BV to form Smurfit Kappa, with the merged company employing 42,000 employees in 33 countries on 5 continents. His share of the merged company was 4.9%. He is also a director of Ballymore International, a property development and investment group, and has investments in other small companies.

He previously owned the K Club in County Kildare, which was sold for €70 million in November 2019.

Interests
Smurfit is a member of a number of sporting and social clubs in Ireland, the United Kingdom, United States, Monaco and Spain. He owns a €53 million super yacht and the Smurfit Art Collection, which contains works by Irish artists such as John Lavery, William Orpen, Louis le Brocquy and Jack B. Yeats.

Smurfit also commissioned Anna Livia, a bronze monument formerly located on O'Connell Street in Dublin. It was affectionately known as the Floozie in the Jacuzzi.

Personal life
He has two daughters and four sons and lives in Monte Carlo. He is an uncle to Irish actress Victoria Smurfit. His son Tony is the current CEO of Smurfit Kappa.

He was appointed as a Knight Commander of the Royal Order of Francis I in November 2002 at a ceremony in Dublin in recognition his of contribution to charitable and humanitarian endeavour.

Recognition
In 2005, Smurfit was appointed to be a Knight Commander of the Most Excellent Order of the British Empire (KBE) in HM The Queen's Birthday Honours List 2005, published in June 2005. The postgraduate business school of University College Dublin, the Michael Smurfit Graduate School of Business, is named after him as a result of his financial support. In 1996, he received the Cross of Merit with Gold Star from the Equestrian Order of the Holy Sepulchre of Jerusalem, for his support for Christians in the Holy Land.

References

External links
 Michael Smurfit School of Business biography

1936 births
20th-century Irish philanthropists
21st-century Irish philanthropists
Living people
21st-century British businesspeople
British expatriates in Monaco
English philanthropists
20th-century Irish businesspeople
Irish expatriates in Monaco
People educated at Clongowes Wood College
People from St Helens, Merseyside
Knights Commander of the Order of the British Empire